20 Lekë (20 L) coins have a value of 20 Albanian lek.

References

Currencies of Albania
Twenty-base-unit coins